Labeo curchius is fish in genus Labeo. It is endemic to the Salween basin in Asia, as indicated by Fishbase, but it was originally described from specimens taken from the Ganges and the source used by Fishbase does not state this species is endemic to the Salween but that it is present in that basin. The taxonomic status of L. curchius is uncertain and it may be a domesticated variety of Labeo gonius.

References 

 

Labeo
Fish described in 1822